Murestan (also Romanized as Mūrestān; also known as Mol’ston) is a village in Sanjabad-e Sharqi Rural District, in the Central District of Khalkhal County, Ardabil Province, Iran. At the 2006 census, its population was 262, in 47 families.

References 

Tageo

Towns and villages in Khalkhal County